Karim Zenoud (born 19 April 1985), better known by his stage name Lacrim (sometimes stylized as LaCrim), is a French rapper of Algerian descent.

Career
After collaborations with various rappers, he released his album Faites entrer Lacrim in May 2012 followed by a mixtape Toujours le même in December 2012. The following two albums, Corleone in 2014 and Force & Honneur in 2017 both topped the French Albums Chart. He also released three successive mixtapes under the R.I.P.R.O series two in 2015 and a third in 2017.

Legal issues 
Accused of possession of a kalashnikov gun, he was condemned to three years of imprisonment. After 8 months of hiding in Morocco, he presented himself on 9 September 2015 to the French authorities who imprisoned him for a second time in three years. He was released on 28 November 2016, after remaining in incarceration for a full year.

Discography

Studio albums

Street albums

EPs

Mixtapes

Singles

*Did not appear in the official Belgian Ultratop 50 charts, but rather in the bubbling under Ultratip charts.

Other charting releases

*Did not appear in the official Belgian Ultratop 50 charts, but rather in the bubbling under Ultratip charts.

Featured in

*Did not appear in the official Belgian Ultratop 50 charts, but rather in the bubbling under Ultratip charts.

Others
2012: "On se rattrape" (Mister You feat. Lacrim and Seth Gueko) (in Mister You album MDR Mec de rue 2)
2013: "Un arabe à Miami" (in compilation album Planète Rap 2013)

References

1985 births
Living people
French rappers
Rappers from Val-de-Marne
French people of Algerian descent